The King River, a perennial river of the North-East Murray catchment of the Murray-Darling basin, is located in the Alpine and Hume regions of Victoria, Australia. It flows from the northwestern slopes of the Alpine National Park in the Australian Alps, through the King Valley, and joining with the Ovens River at the rural city of Wangaratta.

Location and features
The river flows generally north by northwest, most of its course through remote parts of the Alpine and Mount Buffalo national parks, and then descending into the King Valley, joined by eight minor tributaries, before reaching its confluence with the Ovens River at Wangaratta. The river descends  over its  course.

Etymology
The river was given its English name by Hamilton Hume and William Hovell, explorers of the region, in honour of Captain Philip Gidley King, the third Governor of New South Wales, in office from 1800 to 1806.

In the Aboriginal Waywurru language, the river is named Poodumbeyer, with no defined meaning.

Recreation
Kayaking enthusiasts access the river for the many level 2 and level 3 rapids. In 2008 the site for the Victorian and Australian Downriver Championships.

See also

References

External links

North-East catchment
Rivers of Hume (region)
Wangaratta
Alpine National Park
Hume Highway